Davor Kraljević (born 7 July 1978 in Varaždin) is a Croatian retired footballer.

Club career
Kraljević started his footballing career at his hometown club NK Varteks and won two caps for the Croatian U-20 team before moving to Germany in 2000. Having made 9 appearances for Tennis Borussia Berlin, he later played for SV Babelsberg 03 and 1. FC Heidenheim 1846 before signing for SSV Ulm 1846 in 2007.

In November 2009, having made 58 appearances for Ulm, Kraljević was released and his contract was terminated for his role in the 2009 European football betting scandal. Despite not having not been charged, it was announced in May 2010 that Kraljević had signed for the Kreisliga team 1. FC Heiningen.

References

External links
 
 Davor Kraljević profile at 1. FC Heiningen 

1978 births
Living people
Sportspeople from Varaždin
Association football defenders
Croatian footballers
Croatia youth international footballers
NK Varaždin players
Tennis Borussia Berlin players
SV Babelsberg 03 players
1. FC Heidenheim players
SSV Ulm 1846 players
Oberliga (football) players
Regionalliga players
Croatian expatriate footballers
Expatriate footballers in Germany
Croatian expatriate sportspeople in Germany
Sportspeople involved in betting scandals